Aleksandr Staliyevich Portnov (Александр Сталиевич Портнов; born 17 September 1961) is a former Soviet diver and Olympic champion. He competed at the 1980 Olympic Games in Moscow, where he received a gold medal in springboard.

References

1961 births
Living people
Russian male divers
Soviet male divers
Olympic divers of the Soviet Union
Divers at the 1980 Summer Olympics
Divers at the 1988 Summer Olympics
Olympic gold medalists for the Soviet Union
Olympic medalists in diving
Medalists at the 1980 Summer Olympics
Universiade medalists in diving
Universiade silver medalists for the Soviet Union
Medalists at the 1981 Summer Universiade